Live at Montmartre may refer to the following albums recorded at the Jazzhus Montmartre:
Live at Montmartre (Jackie McLean album) (SteepleChase, 1972)
Live at Montmartre (Stan Getz album) (SteepleChase, 1977)
Live at Montmartre (George Adams and Don Pullen album) (Timeless, 1978)